María Sofía Filipek Carvallo (born 9 August 1994) is a field hockey player from Chile, who plays as a midfielder.

Personal life
Sofía Filipek was a student at Universidad de Chile in Santiago, where she studied Commercial Engineering.

Career

Club hockey
Filipek is a member of the COGS hockey club based in Santiago.

National teams
Sofía Filipek has represented Chile at both junior and senior levels.

Under–21
In 2012, Filipek was a member of the national team Chile U–21 at the Pan American Junior Championship in Guadalajara.

Las Diablas
Following her junior debut, Filipek also represented the national team for the first time in 2012.

Filipek won her first medal with Las Diablas in 2013 at the South American Championship in Santiago, where she took home silver. She has also medalled at the 2014 and 2018 South American Games, as well as the 2017 Pan American Cup, winning silver, bronze and silver, respectively.

Throughout her career, Filipek has competed in many major tournaments; most notably the 2015 Pan American Games in Toronto.

References

External links

1994 births
Living people
Chilean female field hockey players
Female field hockey midfielders
South American Games medalists in field hockey
South American Games gold medalists for Chile
South American Games silver medalists for Chile
South American Games bronze medalists for Chile
Competitors at the 2014 South American Games
Competitors at the 2018 South American Games
Competitors at the 2022 South American Games
Sportspeople from Santiago
Field hockey players at the 2015 Pan American Games
Pan American Games competitors for Chile